The Treaty of the Dardanelles (also known as the Dardanelles Treaty of Peace, Commerce, and Secret Alliance, the Treaty of Çanak,  the Treaty of Chanak or ) was concluded between the Ottoman Empire and Great Britain on 5 January 1809 at Çanak, Ottoman Empire. The treaty ended the Anglo-Turkish War. The Porte (the Ottoman government) restored extensive British commercial and legal privileges in the empire. Britain promised to protect the integrity of the Ottoman Empire against the French threat, both with its own fleet and through weapons supplies to Constantinople. The treaty affirmed the principle that no warships of any power should enter the straits of the Dardanelles and the Bosporus. The treaty anticipated the London Straits Convention of 1841, by which the other major powers committed themselves to this same principle.

Notes

External links 
Treaty of Çanak Encyclopædia Britannica
The Encyclopedia of World History (2001)

1809 in the United Kingdom
1809 in the Ottoman Empire
Dardanelles, Treaty of the
Dardanelles, Treaty of the
Dardanelles, Treaty of the
Dardanelles, Treaty of the
Dardanelles, Treaty of the
Ottoman Empire–United Kingdom relations
History of the Dardanelles
1809 in British law
Turkish Straits
January 1809 events